Hamid Dabashi (born 1951) is an Iranian-American professor of Iranian Studies and Comparative Literature at Columbia University in New York City.

He is the author of over twenty books. Among them are Theology of Discontent, several books on Iranian cinema, Staging a Revolution, the edited volume Dreams of a Nation: On Palestinian Cinema, and his one-volume analysis of Iranian history, Iran: A People Interrupted.

Biography
Born and raised in the southern city of Ahvaz in Iran, Dabashi was educated in Iran and then in the United States, where he received a dual Ph.D. in sociology of culture and Islamic studies from the University of Pennsylvania in 1984, followed by a postdoctoral fellowship at Harvard University. He wrote his dissertation on Max Weber's theory of charismatic authority with Freudian cultural critic Philip Rieff. He lives in New York with his wife and colleague Golbarg Bashi.

Major works

Hamid Dabashi's books are Iran: A People Interrupted, which traces the last two hundred years of Iran's history including analysis of cultural trends, and political developments, up to the collapse of the reform movement and the emergence of the presidency of Mahmoud Ahmadinejad.
Dabashi argues that "Iran needs to be understood as the site of an ongoing contest between two contrasting visions of modernity, one colonial, the other anticolonial".

His book Theology of Discontent, is a study of the global rise of Islamism as a form of liberation theology. His other book Close Up: Iranian Cinema, Past, Present, Future (2001) is a text on modern Iranian cinema and the phenomenon of (Iranian) national cinema as a form of cultural modernity and featured in the Lonely Planet travel guide for Iran. In his essay "For the Last Time: Civilizations", he has also posited the binary opposition between "Islam and the West" as a major narrative strategy of raising a fictive centre for European modernity and lowering the rest of the world as peripheral to that centre.

In Truth and Narrative, he has deconstructed the essentialist conception of Islam projected by Orientalists and Islamists alike. Instead he has posited, in what he calls a "polyfocal" conception of Islam, three competing discourses and institutions of authority – which he terms "nomocentric" (law-based), "logocentric" (reason-based) and "homocentric" (human-based) – vying for power and competing for legitimacy. The historical dynamics among these three readings of "Islam", he concludes, constitutes the moral, political and intellectual history of Muslims.

Among his other work are his essays Artist without Borders (2005), Women without Headache (2005), For the Last Time Civilization (2001) and "The End of Islamic Ideology" (2000).

Hamid Dabashi is also the author of numerous articles and public speeches, ranging in their subject matters from Islamism, feminism, globalised empire and ideologies and strategies of resistance, to visual and performing arts in a global context.

Film and art

Dabashi was consulted by Ridley Scott for Kingdom of Heaven (2005). Scott claimed his film was approved and verified by Dabashi: "I showed the film to one very important Muslim in New York, a lecturer from Columbia, and he said it was the best portrayal of Saladin he's ever seen".

Dabashi was the chief consultant to Hany Abu-Assad's Paradise Now (2005) and Shirin Neshat's Women Without Men (2009). Dabashi appears in Bavand Karim's Nation of Exiles (2010), providing analysis of the Iranian Green Movement.

Dabashi has also served as jury member on many international art and film festivals, most recently the Locarno International Festival in Switzerland. In the context of his commitment to advancing trans-national art and independent world cinema, he is the founder of Dreams of a Nation, a Palestinian Film Project, dedicated to preserving and safeguarding Palestinian Cinema.  For his contributions to Iranian cinema, Mohsen Makhmalbaf, the Iranian film-maker called Dabashi "a rare cultural critic".

Public commentary and criticism

Dabashi has been a commentator on a number of political issues, often regarding the Middle East, Columbia University, American foreign policy, or a combination of those.

Columbia University

In 2002, Dabashi sharply criticized Rabbi Charles Sheer (who was the university's Jewish chaplain between 1969 and 2004) after he admonished several professors for cancelling their classes to attend pro-Palestinian rallies. Dabashi wrote in the Columbia Spectator that Rabbi Sheer "has taken upon himself the task of mobilizing and spearheading a crusade of fear and intimidation against members of the Columbia faculty and students who have dared to speak against the slaughter of innocent Palestinians."

Dabashi was one of the three professors named in the Columbia Unbecoming controversy, which included accusations of antisemitism against the professors. According to the New York Times, Dabashi was mentioned principally because of his published political viewpoints, and that he had canceled a class to attend a Palestinian rally. The New York chapter of the American Civil Liberties Union sided with the professors. An ad hoc committee formed by Lee C. Bollinger, Columbia University's president, reported in March 2005 that they could not find any credible allegations of antisemitism, but did criticize the university's grievance procedures, and recommended changes.

Views on Israel
Dabashi has described the state of Israel as "a dyslexic Biblical exegesis," "occupied Palestine," "a vicarious avocation," "a dangerous delusion," "a colonial settlement," "a Jewish apartheid state," and "a racist apartheid state". In an interview with AsiaSource in June 2003, Dabashi stated that supporters of Israel "cannot see that Israel over the past 50 years as a colonial state - first with white European colonial settlers, then white American colonial settlers, now white Russian colonial settlers—amounts to nothing more than a military base for the rising predatory empire of the United States. Israel has no privilege greater or less than Pakistan or Kuwait or Saudi Arabia. These are all military bases but some of them, like Israel, are like the hardware of the American imperial imagination."

In an interview with the Electronic Intifada in September 2002, Dabashi referred to the pro-Israel lobby as "Gestapo apparatchiks" and that "The so-called "pro-Israeli lobby" is an integral component of the imperial designs of the Bush administration for savage and predatory globalization." He also criticized "fanatic zealots from Brooklyn" who have settled on Palestinian lands. Dabashi has also harshly criticized the New York Times for what he describes as a bias towards Israel, stating that the paper is "the single most nauseating propaganda paper on planet."

In September 2004, Dabashi sharply criticized Israel in the Egyptian newspaper Al-Ahram, writing that:

Responding to Dabashi's Al-Ahram essay, Columbia University President Lee Bollinger said, "I want to completely disassociate myself from those ideas. They're outrageous things to say, in my view." Jonathan Rosenblum, director of Jewish Media Resources, later also criticized Dabashi's column. In The Bulletin, Herb Denenberg wrote that Dabashi's article "is not borderline racism. It's as gross and obvious as racism can get." Writing in The Nation, Scott Sherman wrote that Dabashi's article was "troubling" because of its "sweeping characterization of an entire people--"Israeli Jews" or not—as vulgar and domineering in their very essence. The passage can easily be construed as anti-Semitic. Dabashi, at a minimum, is guilty of shrill and careless writing."

In a sworn statement submitted to the US Commission on Civil Rights, Dabashi stated that he has not expressed, nor ever harbored, any anti-Semitic sentiments and that the 2004 Al-Ahram essay was being misconstrued. He has also criticized pro-Israel groups in the United States, saying that the "pro-Israeli Zionist lobby in the US banked and invested heavily in infiltrating, buying, and paying for all the major and minor corridors of power." In the same article, Dabashi endorsed cultural and academic boycotts of Israel.

In a letter to the Columbia Spectator, Dabashi wrote that the above passage was "not a racial characterization of a people, but a critical reflection on the body politics of state militarism" and the effects that it has on human beings. Dabashi also apologized for "any hurt that I may have inadvertently caused" due to the interpretation of the passage.

In an article published January 2009, Dabashi advocated for boycott efforts targeting both individuals and institutions:

On May 8, 2018, Dabashi tweeted, "Every dirty treacherous ugly and pernicious act happening in the world just wait for a few days and the ugly name of 'Israel' will pup".()  Rena Nasar, a StandWithUs campus director, told the student-run news website Campus Reform that "blaming the Jewish state for every problem in the world is virulent anti-Semitism, echoing rhetoric that has led to oppression and violence against Jews for centuries."

Dabashi is on the advisory board of the U.S. Campaign for the Academic & Cultural Boycott of Israel.

Criticism of Lee Bollinger
Following Columbia University President Lee Bollinger's statements on Iranian President Mahmoud Ahmadinejad during Ahmadinejad's visit to Columbia in September 2007 (in which Bollinger stated that the Iranian President was a  "petty and cruel dictator" who lacked the "intellectual courage" to offer real answers on denying the Holocaust) Dabashi wrote that Bollinger's statements were "the most ridiculous clichés of the neocon propaganda machinery, wrapped in the missionary position of a white racist supremacist carrying the heavy burden of civilizing the world." Dabashi further stated that Bollinger's comments were "propaganda warfare ... waged by the self-proclaimed moral authority of the United States" and that "Only Lee Bollinger's mind-numbing racism when introducing Ahmadinejad could have made the demagogue look like the innocent bystander in a self-promotional circus." In addition, Dabashi wrote that when Bollinger made these comments, "Nothing short of the devil incarnate, the Christian Fundamentalist in Bollinger thought, was sitting in front of him" and that Bollinger's "shamelessly racist" comments were "replete with racism."

Judith Jackson, a professor of epidemiology at Columbia who is the co-coordinator of the Israel advocacy group Scholars for Peace in the Middle East, criticized Dabashi for his remarks, stating that  Dabashi's article was "sheer demagoguery" and that "attributing President Bollinger's remarks or behavior to racism is absurd."

Reading Lolita in Tehran and Azar Nafisi

In 2006, Dabashi sharply criticized Azar Nafisi for her book Reading Lolita in Tehran, stating that "By seeking to recycle a kaffeeklatsch version of English literature as the ideological foregrounding of American empire, Reading Lolita in Tehran is reminiscent of the most pestiferous colonial projects" and accusing her of being a "native informer and colonial agent." In an interview with Z Magazine, Dabashi compared Nafisi to former American soldier Lynndie England, who was convicted of abusing Iraqi prisoners at Abu Ghraib."

Nafisi responded to Dabashi's criticism by stating that she is not, as Dabashi claims, a neoconservative, that she opposed the Iraq war, and that she is more interested in literature than in politics. In an interview, Nafisi stated that she's never argued for an attack on Iran and that democracy, when it comes, should come from the Iranian people (and not from US military or political intervention). She added that while she is willing to engage in "serious argument... Debate that is polarized isn't worth my time." She stated that she did not respond directly to Dabashi because "You don't want to debase yourself and start calling names."

References

External links

 Official Web site
 Open Library
 Academic site at Columbia University
 Persian Biography, Makhmalbaf Film House.
 Op-eds
 Hamid Dabashi speaks in the documentary film on Omar Khayyām, Intoxicating Rhymes and Sobering Wine,  (48 sec).
 Hamid Dabashi speaks at Harvard Law School

American sociologists
American literary critics
American art critics
American film critics
21st-century American historians
American male non-fiction writers
American anti-war activists
Iranian democracy activists
Columbia University faculty
Harvard University alumni
20th-century Iranian historians
Iranian expatriate academics
Iranian literary critics
American Iranologists
Literary historians
People from Ahvaz
20th-century Persian-language writers
University of Pennsylvania alumni
1951 births
Living people
Critical theorists
American writers of Iranian descent
21st-century American male writers